David Lancaster may refer to:

David Lancaster (filmmaker), American film and television producer
David Lancaster (writer) (born 1965), Writer and academic
Dave Lancaster (born 1961), English footballer

See also 
Lancaster (surname)
Lancaster (disambiguation)